Jason Bourdouxhe (born 11 April 1991) is a Belgian professional footballer who plays as a midfielder for Belgian National Division 1 club Rupel Boom.

Club career 
Bourdouxhe progressed through the youth system of Dutch club PSV, but never made an appearance for the first team. He was loaned out to second-tier Eerste Divisie club FC Eindhoven in 2012, who then signed him on a permanent deal a year later. On 10 August 2012, he made his professional debut against MVV Maastricht, where he also scored his first goal.

After his two-year contract expired, Bourdouxhe joined VVV-Venlo on a free, where he signed at two-year deal with an option for an extra year. He failed to establish himself as a starter in Venlo, and he left for Helmond Sport after only one season. There, Bourdouxhe signed a two-year contract. After two seasons in Helmond, he moved to FC Emmen, where he made no first-team appearances and only managed to appear for the reserve team.

On 16 April 2019, Bourdouxhe signed a two-year contract with TOP Oss. Upon signing, he stated that "TOP Oss has grown considerably in recent years and the club has been doing well for the last two seasons [...] In addition, I have a good feeling after talking to the manager. We have the same view on football. It is also nice to be able to be closer to my family in Eindhoven again". He made his debut for the club on 9 August 2019, starting at left back against Jong Ajax, a match which TOP managed to win 2–1. Bourdouxhe was, however, mostly used as a backup on the position behind Niels Fleuren, and finished his first season in Oss with six total appearances. Close to the transfer deadline of 2020, he left TOP Oss and decided to return to FC Eindhoven.

On 11 August 2021, Bourdouxhe returned to Belgium for the first time in his senior career and signed a contract for one-year (with an additional year option) with Mouscron. In June 2022, he signed for Rupel Boom. At the age of 31, he became the oldest player in the team's squad.

References

External links
 Voetbal International profile 

Living people
1991 births
People from Fléron
Association football midfielders
Belgian footballers
Belgian expatriate footballers
Belgium youth international footballers
FC Eindhoven players
VVV-Venlo players
Helmond Sport players
FC Emmen players
TOP Oss players
Royal Excel Mouscron players
K. Rupel Boom F.C. players
Eredivisie players
Eerste Divisie players
Challenger Pro League players
Belgian National Division 1 players
Expatriate footballers in the Netherlands
Belgian expatriate sportspeople in the Netherlands
Footballers from Liège Province